Dax Dellenbach (born April 13, 1990) is an American football long snapper for the Tampa Bay Buccaneers of the National Football League (NFL). He played college football at Florida State.

Professional career
On February 7, 2017, Dellenbach signed a reserve/future contract with the Tampa Bay Buccaneers. He was waived by the Buccaneers on May 10, 2017.

Personal life
He is the son of former NFL player and Super Bowl Champion Jeff Dellenbach. Dax is one of 4 children of Jeff and Mary. No other siblings play football. Dax currently lives in Weston, FL with longtime girlfriend, Alyssa.

References

External links
Tampa Bay Buccaneers bio

1990 births
Living people
People from Coconut Creek, Florida
Players of American football from Florida
American football long snappers
Florida State Seminoles football players
Tampa Bay Buccaneers players
Sportspeople from Broward County, Florida